The Pakistan Air Force Academy Asghar Khan is an accredited three-year military academy which provides undergraduate education to officer candidates for the Pakistan Air Force. The eligible and selected candidates from all over Pakistan are sent to PAF Academy Risalpur for flying training. It is located in the town of Risalpur in Nowshera District of the Khyber Pakhtunkhwa province in northwestern Pakistan, it is a premier cadet training institution of the Pakistan Air Force which offers academic professional degrees. Its role is the training of General Duty Pilots (GDP), Aeronautical and Avionics Engineers and the initial training of other Ground Branch cadets. Cadets of all branches join the academy following a recommendation by the Inter Services Selection Board (ISSB) of Pakistan and the Air Headquarters Special Selection Board for Short Service Commission candidates. Graduates of the Academy's four-year program receive a Bachelor of Science degree, and are commissioned as Flying Officers (Lieutenants) in the Pakistan Air Force.

The academy was created in 1910 and was a former airfield of the Royal Flying Corps and later the Royal Air Force. It officially became the airfield of the PAF on 15 August 1947.  On 21 January 1967, it was upgraded to the status of an academy by President Ayub Khan. It has five components.

The Pakistan Air Force Academy Asghar Khan has bred generations of officers for the PAF and other branches of the Pakistan Armed Forces.

Location
Located in a basin 1050 feet above sea level, it is bounded on the south and west by the Kabul and Kalpani rivers, respectively. It is located in Risalpur in Nowshera District and is situated eight kilometers from the city (and district capital) of Nowshera; the famous Khyber Pass lies 90 kilometers to the north. The Risalpur Cantonment itself lies on high ground, some 30 feet above the surrounding area, with the oldest building dating from 1913 or 1914.

Campus
The academy campus is centered around the drill square. The Cadets' mess houses two dining halls for Wing No 1 and Wing No 2,the Sky Lounge, two conference rooms, a movie room and the internet facility. In the front of the mess, lies the red carpet which terminates at the Falcon's Hearth with five cadet blocks on either side of the red carpet to accommodate the cadets. The campus has a gymnasium, four football fields, four hockey fields, four tennis courts, a swimming pool, a polo ground, ten basketball courts, and an athletics field.  The academy also features a Cadets' Mosque, the Hobbies' Club building, the Academy Auditorium, and the Academy Library. New training platforms such as the paradise point and KFC are also being included where mental exercises, MCP and various other activities are carried out.

History

The history of Risalpur airbase dates back to 1910 when an airstrip was developed there. During the First World War, the Royal Flying Corps established a base at Risalpur. In December 1915 RAF's newly raised No. 31 Squadron was stationed here, which was later used against troublesome tribesmen of the Tribal areas along the Afghan border. The squadron flew B.E.2c and Farman biplane in ground support missions. On 24 May 1919, Handley Page V/1500 flew its first mission to attack Kabul from the airfield. In 1925 the air fleet of base was tasked to carry out a survey of the about four hundred square miles area of Ravi's old river bed for finding ancient sites. After First World War, the No. 11 Squadron of Royal Air Force equipped with Westland Wapiti was stationed at the base in 1928, that was also used in the operations in the tribal areas. The bombers of this squadron were used By 1940, Risalpur had become both a training and an operational base. During the Second World War, an operational training squadron was stationed at Risalpur, besides the base also conducted fighter conversion courses.

After the departure of the British, Risalpur was like an abandoned airfield. The airfield was formally established after Pakistan became an independent nation on 14 August 1947 with 20 officers, 21 trainees, 23 senior non-commissioned officers (SNCOs) and 257 airmen. The base comprised only a handful of men and some equipment. About a month later, the Flying Training School was established at Risalpur, that carried out Initial, elementary and advanced flying training. In September 1947, six Harvard aircraft from Flying Training School of Ambala, that were transferred to Pakistan after partition, reached Risalpur. Wing Commander Asghar Khan, later to become the first Air Chief of the PAF, took over as the first Officer Commanding of the School, with Harvard and Tiger Moth aircraft in the inventory. Flt Lt M Khyber Khan, who later rose to the rank of Air Vice Marshal, and his student, Flight Cadet Akhtar, flew the first training sortie on 22 September 1947.

During the Indo-Pakistani War of 1947, the airfield was used to transport personnel and other equipment to the mountain terrain of Northern Areas. In March 1950, Mohammad Reza Pahlavi of Iran, who was the first Head of state to visit Pakistan and a flyer himself, visited the academy. After fifty years of Jinnah's visit to the academy, a commemoration was held on 13 April 1997. Among other veterans, Air Marshal Asghar Khan also witnessed the ceremony who was the commandant at the time of the visit.

On 13 April 1948, the founder of Pakistan, Muhammad Ali Jinnah, visited Risalpur Flying Training School and raised its level to that of a college.  Risalpur thus became the genesis of PAF pilots. It became the only military academy of Pakistan to be visited by Jinnah. At this ceremony, Jinnah took the General Salute at the parade and fighter aircraft from Peshawar Air base performed aerobatics.
During Indo-Pakistani War of 1965 a bomber squadron was stationed here after Peshawar Air Base was hit by IAF. On 21 January 1967 President Ayub Khan elevated the status of the PAF College, Risalpur to that of an academy.

Aircraft
Initially, the institution was equipped with Harvard, Tiger Moth, Auster, Fury and Tempest aircraft. A major change came with the introduction of the Lockheed T-33 jet trainer in 1955 and the air fleet of the academy was transformed from propeller to jet engine aircraft. Eight years after the College was upgraded to an Academy in 1967, the T-6G (Harvard), which had rendered extensive service to the PAF since 1947, was replaced by the Mushshak (Saab Trainer). Currently, the trainer aircraft at the PAF Academy are T-37, Mushshak MFI-17 and the K-8, the last of which was brought into service with the PAF in 1995. The academy has two aviation wings and a squadron. The Primary Flying Training (PFT) Wing consists of MFI-17 while Basic Flying Training (BFT) Wing consists of T-37 aircraft. An Advance Flying Training squadron is composed of K-8 aircraft.
Additionally, the Academy has a fleet of Para Motor Gliders which are used to provide aerial experience to the cadets. These gliders are being looked after by MTW (Military Training Wing).

The T-6G (Harvard) was not replaced/decommissioned in 1967 as mentioned above. I flew this aircraft in 1969 and again in 1971 as part of my aptitude test and later my flying training as a cadet. i don't know what happened to it after 1971.

Constituent units
The PAF Academy consists of 5 components:

College of Flying Training

The College of Flying Training imparts four-year undergraduate programs in science along with equipping cadets of the Flying branch, with flying skills. CFT is affiliated with Air University. The college consists of Flying Training Wing, Directorate of Studies (DOS), Engineering Wing and Flying Instructors School. While the Flying Training Wing with BFT, PFT and K-8 Squadron its sub units, carry out flying training, the Engineering Wing supports the flying wing by maintaining the air fleet and the Directorate of Studies educates the flying and non-flying branch cadets about aviation sciences, administration, airspace management, humanities and other related academic disciplines. The College of Flying Training imparts education to cadets of the General Duty (Pilot), Air Defence, Administration and Special Duties, Logistics, and Navigation courses. After studying the first three semesters, the GD(P) cadets proceed to the Flying Training Wing. Similarly the others course cadets of CFT proceed for further training in SATS (School of Air Traffic Services) and ADTS (Air Defence Training School).

College of Aeronautical Engineering

College of Aeronautical Engineering (CAE) is a constituent institute of the academy, which imparts engineering education to the cadets inducted in the engineering branch of PAF. The institute was set up in July 1965 at Korangi Airfield, Karachi, with the help of US Air Force (USAF) and Colonel John H. Blakelock, a member of USAF became its first principal. The first course graduated from the college on 9 November 1968. In May 1986, the college was shifted from Karachi to Risalpur. The college conducts four-year undergraduate program in two engineering disciplines namely aerospace and avionics. CAE started postgraduate programs in 1997. The college was initially affiliated with University of Karachi and then to NED University of Engineering and Technology in March 1977. The college affiliated with National University of Sciences and Technology in 1995. The institute is equipped with modern engineering labs and workshops. CAE got ISO-9001 certified in 1999 for successfully managing quality system of its academic programs. Apart from Aerospace and Avionics, the institute has three more departments: Industrial Engineering, Humanities & Science, and Professional Continuing Education.

Flying Instructors School
The Flying Instructors School (FIS) trains instructors, not only for the PAF but also for the Pakistan Army and Navy. It trains instructors from countries in the Middle East, Southeast Asia, and Africa. The FIS is also responsible for the maintenance of high standards of teaching in the College of Flying Training, and the Fighter Conversion units. The re-categorization of instructors in all three armed forces is an additional responsibility of the school. FIS training includes academic training, flying training, and instructional technique. The FIS undertakes reciprocal visits to enhance training standards; between 1990 and 1997, these visits were organized with the Central Flying School, UK.

Para Training School
The Para Training School was established at the PAF Academy Risalpur in 2003. It is the second parachute school in Pakistan after the Pakistan Army Para School located at Peshawar. Before its establishment, PAF personnel were trained at the Pakistan Army Para School. The school conducts various basic and advanced courses, including free fall training. It also trains cadets to fly para motor gliders. The Special Service Wing of the PAF also receives parachute training at this school. After a rigorous physical test the top cadets are selected to do the paragliding and para-trooping courses. Paragliding involves wearing a parachute and after jumping from a height, glide and land. Cadets who successfully complete the paragliding course are entitled to wear the paragliding (PG) badge on their uniforms and they further get a chance to now fly para motor gliders which gets them to wear them the PMG badge on their uniforms.

Military Training Wing
The role of the Military Training Wing (formerly Cadet's Wing) is aimed to impart general service training and develop physical fitness, discipline, personal and leadership qualities in cadets. The subjects covered include:

 Air operations
 Use of Small Arms
 Fieldcraft (camping, field exercises etc.)
 Leadership
 Character building
 Physical exercises
 Military drill
 Sports activities
 The cadets mess
 Extracurricular activities
 Literary activities
 Educational visits
 Student counselling

The Military Training Wing comprises officers and instructors who monitor the activities of cadets throughout their training period. The Military Training Wing is sub-divided into four squadrons. The squadrons take part in competitions and the winning squadron is awarded the "Quaid-e-Azam Banner" at the passing out ceremony which is held at the end of term.

The PAF Academy trains officers of the PAF, and cadets and officers of the Pakistan Army, Navy and other countries including Bangladesh, Brunei, China, Indonesia, Iran, Iraq, Jordan, Malaysia, Nepal, Nigeria, Qatar, Saudi Arabia, Sri Lanka, Sudan, Syria, Turkey, Turkmenistan and the UAE.

Events

Passing Out Parade
The Passing Out Parade is held every six months, when the graduating cadets of flying and engineering pass out. The chief guests are usually the President, Prime Minister or the service chiefs of the armed forces of Pakistan. Graduating cadets take the Oath of Allegiance under the flag of Pakistan, after which they take the salute of the parade. The end of the parade is marked by the aerobatics display of the PAF Aerobatic team renowned as the "Sherdils" (flying T-37 aircraft) and the Academy Aerobatic team known as "Academy Hawks" (flying K-8 aircraft).
The awards presented to the cadets at this occasion are:

 Chairman Joint Chiefs of Staff Committee's Trophy (for Best performance in General Service Training in CAE)
 Chairman Joint Chiefs of Staff Committee's Trophy (for Best performance in General Service Training in CFT)

 Chief of Air Staff's Trophy (for Best performance in Engineering Discipline)
 Chief of Air Staff's Trophy (for Best performance in Flying)
 Sword of Honor (for Best performance in CAE)
 Sword of Honor (for Best performance in CFT)

The squadron that achieves best score in sports and other activities during the term is also awarded at this occasion with Quaid-e-Azam Banner.

Convocation
This event also takes place after six months. Two convocations are held each time – one for graduating cadets of the GD(P) branch and the other for cadets of the engineering branch. The awards presented at this occasion are:

 GD(P) Course Convocation 
 Best Performance Trophy (Air Science Subject)
 Best Performance Trophy (Ground Subjects)
 Best Performance Trophy (Humanities Subject)

 Engineering Course Convocation 
 President's Gold Medal (Aerospace Engineering)
 Rector's Gold Medal (Aerospace Engineering)
 Rector's Best Aerospace Vehicle Design Certificate (Aerospace Engineering)
 President's Gold Medal (Avionics Engineering)
 Rector's Gold Medal (Avionics Engineering)
 Rector's Best Avionics System Design Certificate (Avionics Engineering)

Graduation
The graduation ceremony of courses is held bi-annually. The cadets joining ground branches after completing their HSSC spend two to four years at the Academy whereas the Bachelor BS degree holder cadets course has a duration of six months.

Changing of the Guard at Mazare-e-Quaid
The annual Changing of the Guard ceremony at Mazar-e-Quaid, Karachi on Pakistan Defence Day (6 September). Cadets from the PAF Academy assume guard duties at the mazar on this day.

All Pakistan Bilingual Declamation Competition
The PAF Academy holds an All-Pakistan Declamation Competition, one of the biggest annual events. Some forty teams from major higher education institutes in Pakistan are invited to take part. The event takes place over four days during which a number of rounds are held. The PAF bears all the expenses of travel and accommodation of the teams.

Falcons Hearth
The memorial of the academy is known as 'Falcons Hearth' and is situated on the stairs in front of parade ground.  It was erected in memory of cadets and instructors who died during training, and also those who lost their lives on active service during the Indo-Pakistani War of 1965 and the Indo-Pakistani War of 1971.

Gallery

See also
 Military academies in Pakistan
 List of former Royal Air Force stations
 Army Burn Hall College

References

Notes

Sources

External links
 PAF Falcons website
 PAF Museum

Pakistan Air Force bases
Pakistan Air Force education and training
Air force academies
Military academies of Pakistan
Universities and colleges in Nowshera District
Military installations in Khyber Pakhtunkhwa
World War II sites in India